Rudolphe Saintini (born 2 May 1987 in Ivry-sur-Seine) is a French  football player who currently plays for K.V. Oostende in Belgium. He's Mother is Gotin Francine

Career 
The midfielder began his career 2002 by Le Havre AC, joined three years later to LB Châteauroux, played there in the reserve and moved in summer 2008 to Belgium club R.O.C. de Charleroi-Marchienne. Played here between 5 January 2009, 18 games and scored 3 goals moved than with teammate Charles Banga to FCV Dender. In July 2010, he moved to K.V. Oostende.

References

External links
Footgoal Profile

1987 births
Living people
People from Ivry-sur-Seine
Expatriate footballers in Belgium
Le Havre AC players
Association football midfielders
French footballers
LB Châteauroux players
F.C.V. Dender E.H. players
R. Olympic Charleroi Châtelet Farciennes players
French expatriate footballers
Footballers from Val-de-Marne